Lady Like is the debut studio album by American singer-songwriter Ingrid Andress. It was released on March 27, 2020, by Warner Music Nashville. A country pop record, its tracks are inspired by Andress's real-life events. The album focuses on the themes of relationships, family and feminism. Andress co-wrote and co-produced the entirety of it, while working with other producers such as Sam Ellis and Jordan Schmidt. "More Hearts Than Mine" preceded the album, being released in April 2019 as its lead single. It charted on the Billboard Hot 100 and the Canadian Hot 100. The track obtained double platinum certifications from the Recording Industry Association of America (RIAA) and Music Canada (MC).

The album received acclaim from music critics, who praised its mix of country and pop as well as Andress's lyricism. It attained peak positions of four and nine on the country-music charts in the United Kingdom and the United States. On official charts, it peaked at numbers 47 in Scotland, 90 on the Billboard 200 and 91 in Canada. At the 63rd Annual Grammy Awards in 2021, the record was nominated for Best Country Album while the lead single scored a nomination for Best Country Song. Two more singles followed the album"The Stranger" and "Lady Like"which charted moderately on Billboard Hot Country Songs and Country Airplay charts; the latter song was certified gold by the RIAA and MC. A deluxe edition of the album was issued in October 2020, having five more tracks and a different track listing which was arranged accordingly by Andress.

Background and release
Prior to starting a music career, Andress appeared on the second and third seasons of The Sing-Off as part of a cappella groups Pitch Slapped and Delilah, respectively while being enrolled at Berklee College of Music. After graduating from the college in 2013, Andress was advised by her professor, American songwriter Kara DioGuardi, to move to Nashville to pursue a career in songwriting. One year later, Andress, alongside fellow singer Devin Dawson, worked with American record producer Frank Rogers during a writing session. 

Two songs which Andress wrote resulted in her being signed to DioGuardi's music publishing company Arthouse Entertainment, where Andress would eventually begin composing among other songwriters. In December 2016, she independently released the promotional single "Deck the Halls (Holidays Are Here)" alongside musician Eric Arjes. The company released "The Stranger" as Andress's debut single on February 4, 2017. She released "Anything but Love" in October of the same year. In 2018, her songs "Demons Too" and "Paper Thin" were featured on CMT's reality television show Music City. Warner Music Nashville signed Andress as a recording artist in the same year after noticing her contribution to Charli XCX's "Boys" (2017) and Fletcher's "About You" (2018). "Lady Like" would be released as Andress's debut single by the aforementioned label in February 2019. In a March 2019 interview with The Boot, the singer stated that she was going to put out a new song "every couple of months" and that five songs will be released in total and grouped as an extended play "at the top of [2020]". On September 16, Warner Music Nashville issued Andress' debut extended play, The Rosebank Acoustic Sessions which contains acoustic covers of three of her songs. "Both", "We're Not Friends" and "Life of the Party", which were released as promotional singles throughout 2019 and 2020, would all later be included on the album. The Tennessean reported in December 2019 that Andress' debut album would be released in March 2020. She unveiled the album's track listing on March 4, 2020.

Lady Like was released on March 27, 2020, for digital download and streaming. The deluxe edition of the album was released on October 2. It contains two different versions of her songs "More Hearts Than Mine" and "The Stranger", a cover of Charli XCX's "Boys" as well as two new songs, "Feeling Things" and "Waste of Lime", while the entire tracklist was re-arranged. Andress re-arranged the tracklist in order from the earliest song she wrote to the most recent one, stating that she did it "to match that progression of that time of [her] life".

Music and lyrics
Lady Like is a country pop record. The album's lyrics focus on Andress's personal experiences. Overall, they touch on themes of relationships, family and according to Jacob Uitti from American Songwriter, Andress's "signature scuffed-boot-brand of feminism". In a 2021 interview with Spin, she declared that her biggest inspirations for the album were the Chicks, Whitney Houston, John Denver and Adele. One day before the album's release, Andress talked to Billboard and revealed how each song on the record came to fruition. Andress co-wrote and co-produced the entire album. She also worked with producers, Zach Abend, AJ Pruis, Jordan Schmidt and Sam Ellis, having co-produced with the latter six tracks on the standard edition of the album. The tracks were recorded at various studios in Nashville.

The album's opener, "Bad Advice", is about drinking alcohol and kissing strangers in order to get over a break-up. It is a retro cha-cha-inspired track, while Hits Holly Gleason considered it to be "string-bathed Julie London-style '60s Britpop-goes-mariachi". "Both", which discusses a lover's indecisiveness, was inspired by the frustration of Andress's friends with the online dating application Bumble. "We're Not Friends" discusses the mix of a friendship with courtship over banjo and cello sounds. Andress revealed that she wrote the former song with the intention of pitching it to other artists, before choosing to record it herself. "The Stranger" encompasses a piano sound and details a lost romance; Andress wrote it after noticing her generation's unrealistic expectations of love. "Anything but Love" is a guitar-driven ballad about heartbreak which contains a strong back beat. Also a ballad, "More Hearts Than Mine" relates how Andress's family will react if she brings her new boyfriend home. The song was inspired by Andress's real-life indecision of whether or not she should bring her new boyfriend to her family, as they became attached to an ex-boyfriend from a previous relationship of hers. "Life of the Party" showcases Andress being a party animal amidst a break-up. The title track is about defying gender stereotypes; Andress used her personal experiences of being expected to act like a woman as inspiration for the track.

Critical reception

Lady Like received acclaim from music critics. AllMusic's Stephen Thomas Erlewine praised the mix of country and pop and deemed it "bright, glossy, and amorphous". He further added that it is "dense and accessible" throughout its eight tracks, which he considered "something of an achievement" for a debut album. Marlo Ashley of Exclaim! declared that the album "sonically diverges from the country-pop norm; Andress's lyrical honesty adds a sentimental perspective that invites you to listen to something out of the ordinary and makes you crave more." Justin Cober-Lake from Pop Matters gave the album a 7 out of 10 rating, writing that the album succeeds thanks to "a combination of songwriting craft and distinctive sound", and clarifying that Andress's "clear lyrical voice" contributes to its distinctness. Cillea Houghton, writing for Taste of Country, stated that Andress is "intelligent in her writing, clever with her words and has a brazen personality to match," and that she "brings a refreshing voice to country music." Curtis M. Wong of HuffPost called it "remarkably cohesive".

Mesfin Fekadu of the Associated Press considered the album to be "filled with lyrical gems" and added that it is one of the 2020's strongest albums." Paper Abby Schreiber declared that the record is filled with songs that "simultaneously cut you to the quick" but make one feeling "somehow stronger and more empowered." Writing for Variety, Chris Willman stated that Lady Like represents a return to a period when "strong female singer/songwriters who weren't necessarily strictly defined by genre" found their place in it such as Mary Chapin Carpenter and Rosanne Cash, and that Andress's pop crossover potential is "tremendous". Rolling Stone placed the album 24th on their 2020 year-end list of Best Country and Americana Albums with Jon Freeman commending the blending of country and pop and calling the album "charming and polished". At the 63rd Annual Grammy Awards, Lady Like received a nomination for Best Country Album while "More Hearts Than Mine" was nominated for Best Country Song.

Singles and commercial performance
"More Hearts Than Mine" was released in April 2019 for digital download and streaming. It was later sent for radio airplay and impacted country radio stations on June 12 and July 8, respectively. The song was acclaimed by critics, who praised its lyrics and Andress's decision to write the song regarding the situation she was in. The track was Andress's first entry to chart on the Billboard Hot 100, reaching number 30. It also peaked at number 55 on the Canadian Hot 100. The single received double platinum certifications from the Recording Industry Association of America (RIAA) and Music Canada (MC). "The Stranger" was re-released as the second single from Lady Like when it was sent to country radio stations on June 1, 2020, peaking at numbers 49 and 54 on Billboard Hot Country Songs and Country Airplay charts, respectively. It received positive reviews from critics, who praised its theme. "Lady Like" was serviced to country radio stations in October 2020, serving as the third and last single from the record. The track garnered acclaim from critics who complimented its feminist message, while some deemed it an "anthem". It reached the top 40 on both the aforementioned charts and attained gold certifications from the RIAA and MC.

Lady Like debuted and peaked at number nine on Billboard Top Country Albums chart with 9,000 album-equivalent units. The record reached its highest peak on the UK Country Albums chart where it reached number four. It additionally peaked at numbers 47 in Scotland, 90 in Canada and 91 on the Billboard 200.

Track listing
Credits adapted from the liner notes of Lady Like and AllMusic.

Sample credits
"Waste of Lime" contains an interpolation of "Kokomo" (1988) performed by The Beach Boys.
"Boys" is a cover of the 2017 song of the same name by Charli XCX, with a mandolin replacing the video game sample noise.

Credits and personnel
Credits adapted from the standard edition liner notes of Lady Like.

Locations

Anthem House; Nashville, Tennessee (mixing: track 2)
Blackbird Studios; Nashville, Tennessee (recording: track 2)
Evan's Place; Nashville, Tennessee (recording: track 3)
Georgetown Masters; Nashville, Tennessee (mastering: all tracks)
Larrabee Studios; North Hollywood, California (mixing: tracks 6, 8)
Rosebank Studio; Nashville, Tennessee (recording: tracks 1, 48)
Sonic Element Studio; Los Angeles, California (mixing: tracks 1, 3, 48)
The Chambers; Nashville, Tennessee (recording: track 3)
The Library Studio; (strings recording: track 1)
The Planetarium; Nashville, Tennessee (recording: track 4)
The Tracking Room; Nashville, Tennessee (recording: track 2)

Musicians
Sam Ellisbass (tracks 46), acoustic guitar (tracks 1, 4, 6, 8), electric guitar (tracks 4, 6, 7), resonator guitar (track 6), banjo (tracks 7, 8), piano (tracks 1, 58), keyboards (tracks 1, 48), B3 (track 4), background vocals (tracks 4, 6)
Ingrid Andresslead vocals (all tracks), piano (track 4), background vocals (tracks 15, 7)
Jordan Schmidtacoustic guitar, electric guitar (track 2)
AJ Pruisbass, acoustic guitar, electric guitar, keyboards, background vocals (track 3)
Zach Abendkeyboards (track 5)
Miles McPhersondrums, percussion (track 2)
Evan Hutchingsdrums (track 3)
Jared Knealedrums (track 4)
Tony Lucidobass (track 2)
Jamie Mooreacoustic guitar (track 1)
Todd Lombardoacoustic guitar, banjo (track 2)
Tim Gallowayacoustic guitar, electric guitar, resonator guitar, banjo, mandolin (track 3)
Devin Maloneacoustic guitar (track 5), electric guitar (track 1), baritone guitar (tracks 1, 6), steel guitar (tracks 1, 68), cello (tracks 7, 8)
Carl Mineracoustic guitar, mandolin (track 5)
Tyler Chiarellielectric guitar (track 2)
Justin Schippersteel guitar (track 4), pedal steel guitar (tracks 3, 5)
Carole Rabinowitzcello (track 1)
Cremaine Bockercello (track 3)
Dave Davidsonviolin, string arrangement (track 1)
David Angellviolin (track 1)
Monisa Angellviola (track 1)
Alex Wrightpiano, B3, synthesizer (track 2)

Technical
Sam Ellisproduction (tracks 16, 8), additional engineering (tracks 1, 46, 7), programming (tracks 1, 48), digital editing (tracks 1, 4, 5, 7)
Ingrid Andressproduction (all tracks)
Thomas Dulinadditional engineering (track 4)
Tylor Pollertstrings recording (track 1)
Erik Madridmixing (tracks 1, 3, 48)
Aaron Mattesmixing assistant (tracks 1, 35, 7)
Manny Marroquinmixing (tracks 6, 8)
Chris Gallandmixing engineer (tracks 6, 8)
Robin Florentmixing engineer assistant (tracks 6, 8)
Scott Desmaraismixing engineer assistant (tracks 6, 8)
Court Blankenshipproduction assistant (tracks 1, 4, 5, 7)
Jordan Schmidtproduction, recording (track 2)
Bryce Robertsrecording assistant (track 2), programming (track 2)
Jeff Braunmixing (track 2)
Alyson McAnallyproduction coordinator (track 2)
AJ Pruisproduction, engineer, programming (track 3)
Zach Abendproduction, additional engineering, programming, digital editing (track 5)
Andrew Mendelsonmastering (all tracks)

Creative and visual
Mike Mooreart direction & design
Jess Williamsphotography
Sonia Youngwardrobe
Lindsay Doylehair/makeup

Charts

Weekly charts

Year-end charts

Release history

Notes

References

2020 debut albums
Warner Records albums
Ingrid Andress albums